The Blavatnik School of Government is a school of public policy founded in 2010 at the University of Oxford in England. The School was founded following a £75 million donation from a business magnate Len Blavatnik, supported by £26 million from the University of Oxford. It is part of Oxford's Social Sciences Division, which aims to train current and future leaders in the practice of government.   

Alongside the Harvard Kennedy School, the School is widely considered one of the most prestigious schools for public policy in the world.

Courses
The Blavatnik School of Government admitted its first students in 2012. The School's flagship program is the Master of Public Policy (MPP), an intensive one-year graduate degree which seeks to prepare students for a career in public service. The School also offers a DPhil in Public Policy (a three-year full-time research degree).  Applications are made through University of Oxford's central Graduate Admissions and Funding Office.

A range of short courses is also offered for senior professionals and practitioners on specific policy challenges.

Academic staff
Professor Ngaire Woods is the first Dean of the School. Members of faculty include:

 Sir Paul Collier, Professor of Economics and Public Policy
 Stefan Dercon, Professor of Economic Policy
 Karthik Ramanna, Professor of Business and Public Policy
 Christopher Stone, Professor of Practice of Public Integrity 
 Jonathan Wolff, Professor of Public Policy.

In August 2017 Bo Rothstein resigned his position as Professor of Government and Public Policy in protest at Leonard Blavatnik's support for Donald Trump's Inaugural Committee.  Rothstein subsequently criticised the School, stating that he had been "excommunicated" and banned from accessing the building; the School and the University of Oxford denied these claims.

Alumni
Alumni include the youngest mayor in Germany, Marian Schreier; Rafat Al-Akhali, a former minister of youth and sports in Yemen; Shamma Al Mazrui, the youngest Minister of Youth Affairs in the United Arab Emirates  and two members of parliament in Panama, Gabriel Silva and Edison Broce.

Building
The Blavatnik School of Government is located in the University of Oxford's Radcliffe Observatory Quarter, with its main entrance on Walton Street. The building is designed by architects Herzog & de Meuron to promote open discussion, interaction and collaboration. The central forum is inspired by the idea of openness and transparency and connects all the floors together. Construction work started in autumn 2013, after some controversy, and ended in late 2015. The building is controlled by a combination of systems and technology that helps minimise its environmental impact.

The building is taller than Carfax Tower in the centre of Oxford, thus dominating the site and causing opposition to the scheme by local residents in the Jericho district of the city and elsewhere. The site is immediately to the south of the café/bar Freud, in the historic 1836 Greek revival St Paul's Church on Walton Street. The scheme was opposed by the cafe's owner, David Freud, due to its size compared to the church building. The site is also opposite the classical Oxford University Press building. In spring 2013, a public meeting was held in St Barnabas Church and the building was described as "a concrete marshmallow". A historic wall on Walton Street would be demolished as part of the plans.

Later in 2015, the building was described as "the latest striking building nearing completion in Oxford".

In June 2016, the building received a RIBA National Award. The building was shortlisted for the Stirling Prize for excellence in architecture (July 2016) and was awarded the Oxford Preservation Trust plaque in the 'new buildings' category (November 2016).

References

External links
 Official website

2010 establishments in England
Educational institutions established in 2010
Buildings and structures completed in 2015
Departments of the University of Oxford
Public policy schools
Herzog & de Meuron buildings